The 2012 National Club Baseball Association (NCBA) Division I World Series was played at Golden Park in Columbus, GA from May 25 to May 31. The twelfth tournament's champion was Utah State University.

Format
The format is similar to the NCAA College World Series in that eight teams participate in two four-team double elimination brackets. There are a few differences between the NCAA and the NCBA format. One of which is that the losers of Games 1-4 move to the other half of the bracket. Another difference is that the NCBA plays a winner take all for its national title game while the NCAA has a best-of-3 format to determine its national champion.

Participants

Results

Bracket

* denotes extra inning game

Game Results

Championship Game

See also
2012 NCBA Division II World Series

References

2012 in baseball
Baseball in Georgia (U.S. state)
National Club Baseball Association
NCBA Division I